Jean-Pierre "JP" Smith is a South African politician and Cape Town city councillor for Subcouncil 15, Ward 54.  An area that includes Sea Point, Green Point, and Mouille Point.  He is a member of Democratic Alliance and prior to the 2014 general elections he was tipped of as the party's candidate to lead the City's Housing portfolio. Since 2009 he is the mayoral committee member responsible for safety and security in the Democratic Alliance-led Cape Town city council.

Political career 
Smith first started his career in politics as ward councillor for Ward 54 where one of his first issues was campaigning to demolish the wall around Graaff's Pool in Sea Point.  

In 2009 he became the head of the Security Portfolio for the City of Cape Town and led an aggressive campaign against crime and anti-social behaviour in Sea Point using a Broken Windows strategy. Crime had been increasing in the area throughout the 1990s but after the adoption of this approach the area saw a decline in criminal activity throughout the 2000s.

In 2012 Smith was gagged along with other members of the mayoral committee by mayor Patricia De Lille for making comments rejecting plans to allow the Cape Town Stadium to be converted in an attempt to make it financially viable.  The Cape Town Stadium is situated in his constituency where it has drawn criticism from local residences.

Safety and security portfolio 
Since 2009 Smith is the mayoral committee member responsible for safety and security for the City of Cape Town. He spearheaded the adoption and implementation of two important by-laws. The Cape Liquor Law (2013-2014) regulating trading hours and a controversial dog by-law from 2010 to 2012.  He also oversaw the expansion of the city's Metropolitan Police Force whilst fighting attempts by national government to assimilate it into the South African Police Service. Smith also introduced a number of specialised units within the Metropolitan Police to deal with land invasions, road offences, drugs and problem buildings.

Interim DA Deputy Provincial Leader 
On 7 May 2022, Smith was elected as the new interim deputy provincial leader of the DA in the Western Cape. He defeated DA Member of the Provincial Parliament Wendy Philander, Breede Valley mayor Antoinette Steyn and Breede Valley councillor Megann Goedeman.

References

External links
 JP Smith: Councillor Details

Living people
Democratic Alliance (South Africa) politicians
1971 births